Honourable Major Navdeep Singh is an author, lawyer and a former officer of the Indian Territorial Army.

Achievements

Major Navdeep Singh is the most decorated officer in the history of the Indian Territorial Army, a volunteer force in which gainfully employed and self-employed professionals receive military training for a few days in a year so that in the event of a war or a national emergency they can bear arms for the defence of the nation. Singh is also the youngest person connected with the Territorial Army to have been the recipient of eleven commendations from the defence services, including tri-services institutions.
Singh was decorated even after his release from the Territorial Army 

He is also featured in the Army's book of outstanding landmarks called 'Indian Army- Milestones'. He has time and again earned commendations from the Indian Army.

Awards and honours

As can be gathered from independently published articles and official Indian Army website, the following are some of his honours and awards :-

 GOC-in-C's Commendation : 2004 (event unknown)
 Chief of the Army Staff's Commendation (On Independence Day 2005):
 GOC-in-C's Commendation (Also on Independence Day 2005) :
 AOC-in-C's Commendation by Air Force (Republic Day 2006) :
 GOC-in-C's Commendation (Republic Day 2007) :
 Chief of the Army Staff's Commendation (Army Day 2008) :
 Seventh Decoration (Date and nature unknown) :
 Chief of the Army Staff's Commendation (Army Day 2010) :

Profession
Maj. Navdeep Singh is a lawyer by profession and is based at the High Court of the States of Punjab & Haryana in Chandigarh, India.

He is credited with the execution of implementation of the Indian Tolls (Army & Air Force) Act, 1901 all over India. This Act which was passed in 1901 provides for toll tax exemption to private vehicles of defence personnel irrespective of whether they are on duty or not. There was a controversy over implementation of the Act on private toll operators and private toll roads and bridges but the controversy was settled in 2003 when on a case taken up by him, the Indian Ministry of Road Transport & Highways clarified that the Act was valid even for the present times and toll exemption was to be granted to both 'on duty' and 'off duty' defence personnel.

Toll tax exemption to defence personnel was later challenged in the Punjab & Haryana High Court by way of a Public Interest Litigation (PIL) but the petition was dismissed by the Court which upheld the exemption. The Indian Tolls (Army & Air Force) Act, 1901 was then challenged in the Supreme Court of India but the petition was dismissed by the Supreme Court too, thus upholding the provisions of the Act which provides a very special privilege to the military community.

He is also credited with effective implementation of entertainment tax exemption to serving defence personnel in cinemas and theatres. Most of the Indian states offer entertainment tax exemption to men in uniform but the rule was seldom followed or recognised by cinema halls.

He has also been the proponent of wide ranging progressive changes in the military judicial system and the Armed Forces Tribunal.

He was also elected the first President of the Armed Forces Tribunal Bar association as reported in the media.

Perhaps his biggest contribution, as reported in the media, is his fight for independence of judicial institutions, especially the Armed Forces Tribunal, from the tight control of the government and the executive in which he has succeeded to a great extent.

He was also a votary of a National Tribunal Commission for administering tribunals in India, a concept that was endorsed and directed to be instituted by the Supreme Court of India in November 2020.

Other work

He has also worked for the benefit of World War-II veterans and authored several books. Soldiers Know Your Rights was released by General J J Singh, India's Chief of the Army Staff and Pension in the defence services was released by Western Army Commander of India, General T K Sapru.

Another lesser known book called Fauj Hai Mauj (Military is fun) was also written by him. His latest, 'Maimed by the System' was published in 2014 featuring real life stories of soldiers, military veterans and their families who had to fight the system to get their dues. The book was released by General VP Malik (Retd), India's former Chief of the Army Staff. Another version of the book was released in the year 2018.

Singh was a part of a Committee of Experts constituted by the Modi Government to render recommendations for decreasing litigation by the Ministry of Defence and to review all anomalies of service and pension matters and also to strengthen the system of redressal of grievances in the Armed Forces. The 509-page report was submitted in November 2015 in record time and was stated to have submitted practical, workable, reformatory and gradual solutions as per the official Government press release

As reported in the media, he was also a part of the historic “Yale Draft” attended by judges, jurists and representatives of the United Nations to improve upon the ‘UN Draft Principles governing the Administration of Justice through Military Tribunals’ at the Yale University.

He has been associated with other efforts initiated in the Yale Law School for global reform in military justice and military law.

Bibliography
 Fauj Hai Mauj (Military is Fun) : 2000
 Soldiers, Know Your Rights : 2005
 Pension in the Defence Services : 2009
 Maimed by the System : 2014
  Maimed by the System- New Edition : 2018
  Military Pensions: Commentary, Case Law & Provisions : 2020 
  March to Justice: Global Military Law Landmarks : 2021

References

External links
 India Tribune 22 Nov 2001
 Lancer Publishers
 India Tribune 24 Nov 2004
 Bharat Rakshak

Living people
20th-century Indian lawyers
Year of birth missing (living people)